The 1977–78 NBA season was the Nuggets' 2nd season in the NBA and 11th season as a franchise.

In the playoffs, the Nuggets defeated the Milwaukee Bucks in seven games in the Semifinals, winning their first playoff series in the NBA, before losing to the Seattle SuperSonics in six games in the Conference Finals.

Draft picks

Roster

Regular season

Season standings

z – clinched division title
y – clinched division title
x – clinched playoff spot

Record vs. opponents

Playoffs

|- align="center" bgcolor="#ccffcc"
| 1
| April 18
| Milwaukee
| W 119–103
| David Thompson (27)
| Dan Issel (12)
| David Thompson (6)
| McNichols Sports Arena17,297
| 1–0
|- align="center" bgcolor="#ccffcc"
| 2
| April 21
| Milwaukee
| W 127–111
| Dan Issel (22)
| Dan Issel (14)
| Issel, Calvin (6)
| McNichols Sports Arena17,838
| 2–0
|- align="center" bgcolor="#ffcccc"
| 3
| April 23
| @ Milwaukee
| L 112–143
| three players tied (16)
| Anthony Roberts (8)
| David Thompson (5)
| MECCA Arena10,938
| 2–1
|- align="center" bgcolor="#ccffcc"
| 4
| April 25
| @ Milwaukee
| W 118–104
| David Thompson (34)
| Dan Issel (14)
| Wilkerson, Sampson (5)
| MECCA Arena10,938
| 3–1
|- align="center" bgcolor="#ffcccc"
| 5
| April 28
| Milwaukee
| L 112–117
| Bobby Jones (25)
| Dan Issel (15)
| Bob Wilkerson (8)
| McNichols Sports Arena17,838
| 3–2
|- align="center" bgcolor="#ffcccc"
| 6
| April 30
| @ Milwaukee
| L 91–119
| David Thompson (28)
| Bobby Jones (10)
| Bob Wilkerson (6)
| MECCA Arena10,938
| 3–3
|- align="center" bgcolor="#ccffcc"
| 7
| May 3
| Milwaukee
| W 116–110
| David Thompson (37)
| Bob Wilkerson (12)
| David Thompson (6)
| McNichols Sports Arena17,838
| 4–3
|-

|- align="center" bgcolor="#ccffcc"
| 1
| May 5
| Seattle
| W 116–107
| Dan Issel (25)
| Issel, Hillman (11)
| Bob Wilkerson (10)
| McNichols Sports Arena17,387
| 1–0
|- align="center" bgcolor="#ffcccc"
| 2
| May 7
| Seattle
| L 111–121
| Dan Issel (29)
| Dan Issel (14)
| Ralph Sampson (7)
| McNichols Sports Arena17,838
| 1–1
|- align="center" bgcolor="#ffcccc"
| 3
| May 10
| @ Seattle
| L 91–105
| David Thompson (21)
| Anthony Roberts (8)
| Jones, Webster (3)
| Seattle Center Coliseum14,098
| 1–2
|- align="center" bgcolor="#ffcccc"
| 4
| May 12
| @ Seattle
| L 94–100
| Dan Issel (27)
| Darnell Hillman (11)
| Bob Wilkerson (8)
| Seattle Center Coliseum14,098
| 1–3
|- align="center" bgcolor="#ccffcc"
| 5
| May 14
| Seattle
| W 123–114
| David Thompson (35)
| Bobby Jones (11)
| Bob Wilkerson (10)
| McNichols Sports Arena17,006
| 2–3
|- align="center" bgcolor="#ffcccc"
| 6
| May 17
| @ Seattle
| L 108–123
| David Thompson (21)
| Anthony Roberts (16)
| Bob Wilkerson (8)
| Seattle Center Coliseum14,098
| 2–4
|-

Awards and records
 David Thompson, All-NBA First Team
 Bobby Jones, NBA All-Defensive First Team

References

Denver Nuggets seasons
Denver
Denver Nuggets
Denver Nuggets